An election for the leadership of the New South Wales branch of the Australian Labor Party was held in June 2021., triggered by the resignation of Leader Jodi McKay on 28 May 2021.

Nominations for the leadership opened at 11:00 AEST on 4 June 2021. Each candidate would have had 48 hours to produce at least 15 signatures from caucus members to nominate. With Chris Minns as the only candidate to nominate for the leadership, he was elected unopposed as the new party leader. Prue Car was elected unopposed as deputy party leader four days later.

Background
Following Labor's loss in the 2021 Upper Hunter by-election, then-leader Jodi McKay resigned under pressure from the party caucus. Initially the leadership election saw former opposition leader Michael Daley, who led Labor to a defeat in the 2019 New South Wales state election declare his candidacy for a second time on 30 May 2021. Chris Minns would subsequently announce his candidacy for a third time the next day, having lost to Daley and McKay in previous ballots. On 4 June 2021, on the date nominations opened, Daley announced his withdrawal from the election citing the lack of support and "for the good of the party". The leadership election represents the fifth time that Labor has changed its leadership since the defeat in the 2011 election with only two leaders having led the party to an election as of 2021.

Candidates
Under party rules, if there were more than one candidate, the election would be a combined vote by the party membership and the Labor members of the Parliament of New South Wales, with each component weighted equally. As there was only one candidate (Chris Minns) nominated for leadership, Minns was elected unopposed.

Declared
Chris Minns, Shadow Minister for Transport

Withdrew
Michael Daley, Leader of the Opposition (2018–2019)

Declined
Ryan Park, Shadow Minister for Health
Paul Scully, MP for Wollongong

Controversies

Daley
On 31 May 2021, a number of Asian Australian members and elected officials of NSW Labor released a joint statement criticising Michael Daley's candidacy citing comments made in 2018 about how residents in New South Wales were "being replaced by young people from typically Asia with PhDs." While Daley apologised about the comments prior to the 2019 state election, many have attributed the swing against the ALP in electorates in the Georges River local government area in the 2019 election owing to Daley's comments. Both electorates saw a heavy swing against the ALP in 2019 with Oatley seeing a swing towards the Liberal Party of Australia  from 6.6% in 2015 to 10.3% in 2019 while Kogarah, held by prospective leadership candidate Chris Minns went from 6.9% to less than 2% in the same election. On 1 June 2021, Daley apologised again on ABC Radio for his "offensive" comments.

Minns
A report by The Daily Telegraph on 31 May reported that the head office of NSW Labor was "encouraging" members of the caucus to support Minns' candidacy for the leadership to avoid a contested ballot. In addition, another report by The Daily Telegraph also stated that Shadow Minister for Health Ryan Park decided not to contest the leadership to ensure a quick succession of leadership. The 2019 leadership election which saw outgoing leader Jodi McKay defeating Minns went for 22 days to finalise a result.

See also

2019 New South Wales state election
2023 New South Wales state election
2019 Australian Labor Party (New South Wales Branch) leadership election

References

2021 elections in Australia
Australian Labor Party leadership spills
Australian Labor Party (New South Wales Branch) leadership election